The 1902 Penn Quakers football team represented the University of Pennsylvania in the 1902 college football season. The Quakers finished with a 9–4 record in their first year under head coach Carl S. Williams. Significant games included victories over Penn State (17–0), Columbia (17–0), and Cornell (12–11), and losses to Navy (10–6), Harvard (11–0), and Carlisle (5–9).  The 1902 Penn team outscored its opponents by a combined total of 157 to 68. Three Penn players received recognition on the 1902 College Football All-America Team: end Sol Metzger (Walter Camp, 3rd team); tackle Robert Torrey (Caspar Whitney, 2nd team); and center James F. McCabe (Camp, 3rd team).

Schedule

References

Penn
Penn Quakers football seasons
Penn Quakers football